Cnemaspis tubaensis is a species of gecko endemic to Malaysia.

References

tubaensis
Reptiles described in 2020
Fauna of Malaysia